The Central Council of Jews in Germany (German name: Zentralrat der Juden in Deutschland) is a federation of German Jews. It was founded on 19 July 1950, as a response to the increasing isolation of German Jews by the international Jewish community and increasing interest in Jewish affairs by the (West) German government. Originally based in the Rhenish areas (Düsseldorf and Bonn), it transferred its seat to Berlin after the Reunification of Germany (1990). As of 2015 the Jewish community in Germany has around 100,000 registered members, although far more Jews live in the country without belonging to a synagogue. From its early years, the organisation has received strong financial and moral support from the government. Since the end of november 2014, Josef Schuster, an internist from Würzburg, has been president of the Zentralrat. He follows Dieter Graumann, who was the incumbent from November 2010 to November 30th 2014.

The Zentralrat is the German affiliate of the World Jewish Congress (WJC).

History

In its early years, its leadership was composed of native German Jews (Yekkes), while most of the Jewish community in Germany was made up of Polish-born Jewish Holocaust survivors who had come to Germany as displaced persons, fleeing from the sporadically anti-Zionist and antisemitic communist regime of Poland. Thus, the organisation called itself "Central Council of Jews in Germany" rather than "Central Council of German Jews."  Over time, the Polish-born Jews or their children acculturated to German society and became leaders of the Jewish community. By the late 1980s, the organisation considered changing its name. Since the collapse of the communist regimes of eastern Europe, Germany has experienced a great influx of Russian Jews and other Jews from the former Soviet Union (that collapsed in 1991). Although most of the Jews now living in Germany are recent immigrants, the organisation is dominated by the so-called "German" Jews (who themselves are primarily descended from the Eastern European immigrants of the immediate postwar years).

At various times in its history, the organization has faced corruption scandals, most notably under the administration of Werner Nachmann (president 1969 until 1988), involving financial irregularities. After Nachmann's death (January 1988), Heinz Galinski (1912–1992), the chairman of the West Berlin Jewish community for 43 years, assumed the leadership of the Central Council and brought it stability and respectability. Under Ignatz Bubis (1927–1999), the Central Council assumed a much greater profile in German public life, and the Jewish community's leadership felt increasingly confident weighing in on public debates concerning Holocaust memory and German identity.

In more recent years, the division between more observant and more liberal Jews has strained the organisation, which remains (or claims to be) the sole representative body of the Jewish community in Germany and which generally supports strict observance. In April 2004, open controversy erupted between the leader of the Central Council, Paul Spiegel (1937–2006), and the leader of the more liberal organisation Union of Progressive Jews in Germany, Jan Mühlstein (born 1949). The latter demanded equal financial support from the government for his organisation.

In 2009, the Central Council criticised the Vatican over its decision to lift the excommunication on the bishops of the Society of Saint Pius X. It later boycotted a ceremony in the Berlin parliament which commemorated victims of the Holocaust, saying its leaders had been treated without the proper respect in previous years.

Chairpersons/Presidents 
1954–1963: Heinz Galinski
1963–1969: Herbert Lewin
1969–1988: Werner Nachmann
1988–1992: Heinz Galinski
1992–1999: Ignatz Bubis
2000–2006: Paul Spiegel
2006–2010: Charlotte Knobloch
2010–2014: Dieter Graumann
2014–present: Josef Schuster

Secretaries-general 
1950–1973: Hendrik George van Dam
1973–1988: Alexander Ginsburg
1988–1992: Micha Guttmann
2004-2014: Stephan J. Kramer

References

Further reading

External links
  

Jewish organisations based in Germany
Jews and Judaism in Berlin
Organisations based in Berlin
Organizations established in 1950
1950 establishments in West Germany
Yekke